Carl William Sharsmith (March 14, 1903 – October 14, 1994) was an American naturalist and Yosemite park ranger, notable for his knowledge and interpretation of the natural history of the Sierra Nevada. He taught botany at various universities, and was the first botanist to comprehensively document the alpine flora of the high Sierra Nevada.


Biography
Born Karl Wilhelm Schaarschmidt II in New York City to Swiss and German parents, he grew up the U.S., Europe, and Canada.
Sharsmith was inspired by the works of naturalist John Muir and became interested in the outdoors and nature.  He dropped out of school at 14, but became inspired enough to finish his high school and college education.

Sharsmith enrolled in the Yosemite School of Field Natural History in 1930 then was hired as a seasonal Ranger-Naturalist in Tuolumne Meadows, Yosemite National Park the following year.

He received his BA from the University of California, Los Angeles in 1933, and his Ph.D. in botany from the University of California, Berkeley in 1940.

Sharsmith would work each summer as a Ranger-Naturalist and spend the rest of the year teaching or performing herbarium research.
He was said to have explored nearly every "nook and cranny" of Yosemite's High Sierra

The rest of the year he taught or researched at various schools, that included Stanford University, the University of Minnesota, and San Jose State University. Sharsmith was Professor of Botany at San Jose State from 1950 to 1973.

On his opinion of teaching he said, "people are not interested in facts. The greater appeal is to the heart."  On nature walks, he would often kneel down and talk about a flower.  One of his favorite flowers was Raggedy Aster (Aster integrifolius).  When asked what he would do if he only had a day to see Yosemite he replied, "I'd sit by the Merced River and cry."

Besides interpreting for visitors, Sharsmith did basic research on the alpine meadows of the High Sierra, gathering thousands of herbarium specimens, and publishing several research papers.

Sharsmith's last season as a park ranger-naturalist was during the summer of 1994. At age 91, he was oldest active NPS park ranger in the US at the time. He died at his home in San Jose, California just a few weeks after he completed his final season in uniform at Tuolumne Meadows in Yosemite National Park.

Personal life
Helen K. Sharsmith, his wife, was a biologist and botanist with a Ph.D. from UC Berkeley. They had a son John, named after John Muir, and a daughter Linnea, named after Carl Linnaeus. Sharsmith and his wife later divorced.

His interests included botany, zoology, geology, classical music, Shakespeare, and singing opera.

Carl Sharsmith died 1994 in his home at San Jose, California.

Awards
 National Park Service Meritorious Service Award in 1956, the highest award for an NPS employee
 Yosemite Award in 1990, as the first recipient, recognized the "rich legacy he has given this park."

Legacy
 Carl W. Sharsmith Herbarium at San José State University.
 Sharsmith's stickseed (Hackelia sharsmithii) — named for him by I.M. Johnston, but discovered by Sharsmith and his wife Helen Sharsmith at Mirror Lake after climbing Mount Whitney
 Sharsmith's draba (Draba sharsmithii), or Mount Whitney draba (Rollins and R.A. Price) — endemic to southern Sierra Crest in Mount Whitney area.
 Sharsmith Peak, informal name for Peak 12002 in Yosemite National Park, and proposed official name.

See also
 O'Neill, Elizabeth Stone, Mountain Sage: The Life of Carl Sharsmith Yosemite Ranger/Naturalist 2d ed. (1996) .
 Sharsmith, John and Allan Shields, Climb Every Mountain: A Portrait of Carl Sharsmith by (1996). .
 Boyer, David S., "Yosemite--Forever?," National Geographic, 167(1):52- (January, 1985). Includes photos and text about Sharsmith.
 Neeley, Will, “Dr. Carl W. ‘Zeke’ Sharsmith,” Yosemite Nature Notes, 46(2):76-80 (August 1977)
 Bingaman, John, "Dr. Carl Sharsmith", Guardians of the Yosemite (1961)

References

External links
 

American naturalists
Botanists with author abbreviations
1903 births
1994 deaths
Scientists from California
History of the Sierra Nevada (United States)
Yosemite National Park
San Jose State University faculty
University of California, Berkeley alumni
University of California, Los Angeles alumni
People from Merced County, California
People from San Jose, California
20th-century American botanists
20th-century naturalists